Kartogol (also known as Kortogol-e Pā’īn) is a village in Javanmardi Rural District, Khanmirza District, Lordegan County, Chaharmahal and Bakhtiari Province, Iran. At the 2006 census, its population was 127, in 34 families. The village is populated by Lurs.

References 

Populated places in Lordegan County